Protoelongata heleneae is a species of sea snail, a marine gastropod mollusk, in the family Costellariidae, the ribbed miters.

Description
The length of the shell attains 11 mm.

Distribution
This marine species occurs off Guam.

References

 Herrmann M., Stossier G. & Salisbury R.A. (2014) A new subgenus including three new species of the genus Vexillum (Gastropoda: Costellariidae) from the central Indo-Pacific with remarks on Vexillum (Pusia) semicostatum (Anton, 1838). Contributions to Natural History 24: 1–55

Costellariidae